Keri Lees (née Maddox; born 4 July 1972 in Stone, Staffordshire is a female retired English athlete.

Athletics career
She competed in the 100 metres hurdles and 400 metres hurdles. and represented her country at the 2000 Summer Olympics, as well as three World Championships (1993, 1999, 2001).

She represented England in both the 100 metres hurdles and 400 metres hurdles events, at the 1998 Commonwealth Games in Kuala Lumpur, Malaysia.

Competition record

Personal bests
Outdoor
100 metres hurdles – 12.95 (+1.1 m/s) (Seville 1999)
400 metres hurdles – 55.22 (Birmingham 2000)
Indoor
60 metres hurdles – 8.17 (Maebashi 1999)

References

1972 births
Living people
People from Stone, Staffordshire
Sportspeople from Staffordshire
British female hurdlers
English female hurdlers
Olympic athletes of Great Britain
Athletes (track and field) at the 2000 Summer Olympics
Commonwealth Games competitors for England
Athletes (track and field) at the 1998 Commonwealth Games
World Athletics Championships athletes for Great Britain
Universiade medalists in athletics (track and field)
Universiade bronze medalists for Great Britain
Medalists at the 1991 Summer Universiade